Oliver Alexander Thornton (born 15 July 1990) is a British singer and actor. He is best known as the lead singer of  Years & Years and for his performance as Ritchie Tozer in the Channel 4 drama series, It's a Sin. Alexander is a six-time Brit Awards nominee and has also been nominated for the British Academy Television Award for Best Actor and the Critics' Choice Television Award for Best Actor in a Limited Series or Movie Made for Television.

Early life 
Alexander was born in Harrogate, North Yorkshire. His mother, Vicki Thornton, was one of the founders of the Coleford Music Festival. Alexander attended St John's Primary School in Coleford and Monmouth Comprehensive School. While at Monmouth Comprehensive School, he acted in two school plays: Guys and Dolls, as Benny, and The Caucasian Chalk Circle, as the Corporal. After completing his GCSEs, Alexander studied Performing Arts at the Hereford College of Arts. The New York Times reported that he wrote his first song on his father's Casio keyboard aged 10. His parents separated when he was 13, and he and his brother Ben, who is autistic, were thereafter brought up solely by his mother.

He obtained the services of an agent when he was 16, while auditioning for a part in British TV series Skins. In a YouTube video uploaded from NylonMagazineTV, Alexander said he dropped out of the Hereford College of Arts to pursue his acting career as parts were offered, stating: "I started acting when I was young; it just sort of happened. I dropped out of school to work around the world, which was amazing." "I really wanted to become a singer or a musician ... All of a sudden I was an actor. It was never something I'd set my heart on being. I'm still trying to work it out ... I really hated school because I was totally bullied. But you're never bullied in drama class because the weird kids do well in drama class. That's a safe place". Alexander was interviewed about his mental health by Guardian columnist Owen Jones. He further expanded on his bullying, bulimia and early life experiences during a 2021 interview in the same publication.

Career

Acting career 
Alexander's acting career began in the film Summerhill released in 2008. His next film Bright Star was nominated for an Academy Award in the United States for Best Achievement in Costume Design. He acted in the 2009 released films Tormented starring Alex Pettyfer and Enter the Void. In 2010 he played Evan in the Bush Theatre production of The Aliens. Alexander contributed to the script and music for indie film The Dish & the Spoon, released in early 2011. In 2012, he appeared in the theatre production of Mercury Fur, taking the part of Naz at The Old Red Lion, Islington.

From March to June 2013, Alexander starred as Peter Pan in the West End play Peter and Alice acting alongside Ben Whishaw and Judi Dench. Alexander also had a supporting role in the final series of Skins, playing Cassie Ainsworth's stalker in the two-part episode "Skins Pure", which aired in July 2013. Also in 2013 Google Analytics released an internal corporate video which features Alexander as a demanding shopper under the sub-heading "That is what happens when you save on usability".

Alexander plays one of the main characters in the 2014 musical feature film God Help the Girl, where he also sings and plays guitar. The film was written and directed by Stuart Murdoch, the lead singer of the group Belle and Sebastian, as part of the God Help the Girl project.

Alexander also appeared in The Riot Club, the film adaptation of Laura Wade's stage play Posh alongside British actors Sam Claflin, Max Irons and Douglas Booth. Alexander briefly portrayed the vampire Fenton in the British-American horror series Penny Dreadful in episodes aired in 2014.

In the indie film Funny Bunny, which first premiered at SXSW 2015, Alexander plays Titty, a troubled teenager. The film was directed and written by Alison Bagnall, who directed The Dish & the Spoon, while Alexander was a co-writer together with the other two leads. The film was shown at art houses during the summer and was theatrically released on 13 November 2015.

In January 2021, Alexander appeared in a leading role in Russell T Davies' Channel 4 and HBO Max drama It's a Sin, which depicts gay life in the 1980s and early 1990s, and the onset of HIV/AIDS. The show and Alexander's performance earned critical acclaim, with some critics expressing their desire for Alexander to win a BAFTA for his performance.

Music career 
Years & Years formed in 2010, with Alexander joining the band as lead vocalist after member Mikey Goldsworthy heard him singing in the shower and liked his voice. Alexander's voice has been commented on for its unique tone, with the music being described as "Nina Simone ...crooning a melodic lullaby to the folktronic lovechild of Beach House and Terry Riley".

Their debut single "I Wish I Knew" was released in July 2012 on the Good Bait label, with the band performing as a five-piece group. In 2013, the group signed a deal to the French label Kitsuné as a three-piece and released their second single, called "Traps", in September 2013, which achieved support from Radio 1 and Radio 6, as well as many online publications such as The Guardian and The Fader. "Traps" also features on Kitsuné Maison's 15th compilation.

The band released their second single "Real" on Kitsuné and iTunes in February 2014. The music video featured an appearance from Alexander's Peter and Alice co-star, Ben Whishaw, and former Misfits actor Nathan Stewart-Jarrett. Telling the story in The Independent article of 28 July 2015 of the Ben Whishaw effect (most recent James Bond Q actor), the video received eight and a half million views online, and in 2014 they also changed their record label from the French smaller label Kitsuné to Polydor as they gained prominence. In January 2015, they were announced winners of the BBC's Sound of... vote.

Years & Years' most successful single, "King", released under Polydor, headed straight to number one in the UK Single Chart in March 2015, earning the band national recognition. Their debut studio album, Communion, was released on 10 July 2015 and entered the UK Albums Chart at number 1.

As a gay songwriter, Alexander has stated in interviews he would like to see greater use of the qualified male pronoun in music. He explained that when he used to write in a diary, he would refer to "you and I" because he wanted to hide who he was writing about. Several Years & Years songs feature male pronouns. "It is kind of sad to me that we don't have gay popstars singing about men using a male pronoun," he told Digital Spy, "but that could change hopefully." Though his work with Years & Years openly references his sexuality, Alexander "can't speak for all gay people, because there are so many different issues, and experiences, and different shapes and sizes. But I can speak for myself, and that is what I'm doing if I'm going to be writing songs and giving interviews, I want to be able to speak about something I care about."
Years & Years' second studio album, titled Palo Santo, was released on 6 July 2018 and features hits like "If You're Over Me" and "Sanctify". On 14 August 2018, "If You're Over Me" was certified Gold by the British Phonographic Industry and announced via the band's Twitter account

In September 2018, Years & Years released the official music video for "All For You", featuring an angelic version of Alexander dancing within an abandoned warehouse before transforming into a demonic version of himself and engaging in a dance-off with an android.

Alexander collaborated with the Pet Shop Boys on their 2019 single 'Dreamland,' and later released a cover of their hit 'It's a Sin' to coincide with his starring role in the drama series of the same name.

On 18 March 2021, Years & Years became the solo project of Olly Alexander.

In July 2021, Alexander was announced as one of the five musicians hosting BBC Radio 1's Future Sounds show for the month of August and early September alongside Arlo Parks, YUNGBLUD, Charli XCX and Tom Grennan. Annie Mac, who hosted Future Sounds, left the radio station in late July after spending 17 years there.

Advocacy, politics and personal life 

Through various interviews and charity campaigns, Alexander has promoted safer sex and HIV screening, and anti-LGBT bullying initiatives. He has also spoken openly about his own struggles with depression, self-harm, eating disorders and anxiety from age 13 onwards. He is openly gay, and in 2017, he presented a BBC Three documentary investigating the link between being gay and the development of mental health disorders where he opened up about his bulimia. In 2018, Alexander was part of Sport Relief's attempt to raise awareness of mental health alongside other celebrities Nadiya Hussain and Stephen Fry.

Alexander describes himself as a "real left-winger" and said in 2016 that he "had a crush on" Labour Party leader Jeremy Corbyn.

From May 2015, Alexander was in a relationship with musician Neil Milan Amin-Smith, who was in Clean Bandit. Due to scheduling conflicts whilst on tour and recording, they parted at the end of 2015.

At the 2016 Glastonbury Festival, Alexander took to the stage with his band Years & Years in rainbow ensemble in celebration of PRIDE Week and made headlines with his spur-of-the-moment speech in light of the Orlando nightclub shooting.

In September 2018, Alexander won GQs Award "Live Act Of The Year". The award was presented to him by Héloïse Letissier, and in his acceptance speech, Alexander advocated for the LGBTQ community and Mental Health Awareness Month, particularly in regard to men.

In the same month, Alexander took part in a video campaign "The Flag We Shouldn't Be Proud Of" for World Suicide Prevention Day, holding up a rainbow flag with two colours ripped from it, and was quoted: "This is the flag we shouldn't be proud of. A flag that represents the two in six LGBTQ people we risk losing to suicide."

In October 2018, British GQ posted an interview between Alexander and Alastair Campbell where he spoke about his struggles with self-harm and eating disorders, his experiences in 2018 with homophobia, his political views on Brexit and Donald Trump. In the interview he said he voted Remain in the 2016 referendum, supported Corbyn as Prime Minister and called Trump "repugnant" and "repulsive".

During Years & Years' performance on the Pyramid Stage at the 2019 Glastonbury Festival, Alexander gave a speech promoting LGBTQ+ rights and calling for the elimination of racism, ableism and sexism. The speech earned praise from fans and media.

Awards and honours 
In June 2020, in honour of the 50th anniversary of the first LGBTQ Pride parade, Queerty named him among the 50 heroes "leading the nation toward equality, acceptance, and dignity for all people".

In November 2020, Alexander won the LGBT Celebrity of the Year award at the British LGBT Awards.

For his leading role in It's a Sin, Alexander was nominated for a Critics' Choice Television Award for Best Actor in a Limited Series or Movie Made for Television and the British Academy Television Award for Best Actor.

Discography 

 Communion (2015)
 Palo Santo (2018)
 Night Call (2022)

Filmography

Film

Television

Theatre

Corporate video

References

External links 
 
 

English male child actors
English male film actors
English male television actors
English male stage actors
English pop singers
Male actors from Yorkshire
Musicians from Harrogate
Actors from Harrogate
English gay musicians
English gay actors
English LGBT actors
British LGBT rights activists
English LGBT singers
1990 births
Living people
English tenors
Labour Party (UK) people
21st-century English male singers
21st-century English LGBT people
20th-century English LGBT people
Victims of cyberbullying